Afterglow is the second solo album by illustrator and musician Marcellus Hall.  The title song was listed on the New York Music Daily as song #48 on the 100 best songs of 2012 before the album was released.  The Hostages consist of Troy Fannin on keyboard and guitar, Mike Shapiro on drums, and Damon Smith on bass. Mike Duclos also played Upright Bass on the album. Marcellus Hall said the members of the Hostages where not literally hostages but said this backup band was more cohesive as a group over other backup ensembles he had played with. The album was released at Rockwood Music Hall in the Lower East Side of New York City on December 10, 2013.

Track listing
All lyrics and music written by Marcellus Hall.

References

2013 albums
Marcellus Hall albums